Héctor Ariel Silva (born 17 January 1976 in Santa Fe) is a retired Argentine football striker.

Silva started his playing career with Unión de Santa Fe in 1994, the club were going to  promote  the Argentine Primera in 1996 and Silva enjoyed two seasons at the top level of Argentine football. In 1998, he joined Club Atlético Douglas Haig and then played for a succession of teams in the Argentine 2nd division.

In 2005, Silva joined newly promoted Gimnasia de Jujuy. Making his return to the top flight, he enjoyed a productive season, helping Gimnasia maintain their place in the Primera. Silva joined Banfield for the Apertura 2006, but returned to Gimnasia after only making 9 appearances for Banfield.

External links
 Argentine Primera statistics
 Football-Lineups player profile

1976 births
Living people
Footballers from Santa Fe, Argentina
Argentine footballers
Association football forwards
Unión de Santa Fe footballers
Atlético Tucumán footballers
Instituto footballers
Talleres de Córdoba footballers
Gimnasia y Esgrima de Jujuy footballers
Club Atlético Banfield footballers
Galatasaray S.K. footballers
Club Atlético Paraná players